Small Time may refer to:

Small Time, a 1996 film
Small Time (2014 film), a film by Joel Surnow
Small Time (album), an album by The Servants
The Small Time, an album by Grey DeLisle